The 1999 Gloucester City Council election took place on 5 May 1999 to elect members of Gloucester City Council in England. The council elected a third of the council and was controlled by the Labour Party.

Results 

|}

Ward results

Barton

Eastgate

Kingsholm

Linden

Longlevens

Matson

Podsmead

Quedgeley

Tuffley

Westgate

References

1999 English local elections
1999
1990s in Gloucestershire